is a Japanese tokusatsu television series. It is Toei's 22nd entry of the Super Sentai metaseries. The series aired from February 22, 1998, to February 14, 1999, replacing Denji Sentai Megaranger and was replaced by Kyuukyuu Sentai GoGoFive. Its footage was used in Power Rangers Lost Galaxy. The lead screenwriter for the series is Yasuko Kobayashi.

At the 2017 San Diego Comic-Con, Shout! Factory announced that they would be releasing Seijuu Sentai Gingaman in Japanese with English subtitles on DVD. It was released on January 30, 2018. This is the seventh Super Sentai series released on Region 1 DVD in North America. In July 2018, Shout! made the series available on-demand on their website.

Plot
Three thousand years ago, the Space Pirates Balban invaded Earth. The Starbeasts and the first Gingamen, warriors of the Ginga Forest, fought them with a mystical power known as Earth and eventually imprisoned them. The Ginga people later cloaked their forest within marked boundaries and passed on the duty of the Ginga warriors through generations.

In the present day, Hyuuga, Hayate, Gouki, Hikaru and Saya are chosen as the 133rd warriors of the Starbeast Swords. Ryouma is very happy that his elder brother Hyuuga succeeds to the title. When Orghi holds the succession ceremony of the Starbeast Swords, an earthquake breaks the seal on the Balban.

Orghi orders the 133rd warriors to get the Ginga Braces hidden in Roaring Mountain. However, the Balban attacks them to prevent the birth of the new Gingamen. During the battle, Hyuuga is swallowed into a crack in the ground created by the Balban's leader, Captain Zahab. Enraged, Ryouma activates his hidden Earth power and awakens the Ginga Braces. The Gingamen fight together with the Starbeasts against the Balban, who desire to revive the Demon Beast Daitanix, on whose corpse they built their castle.

Gingamen

The Gingamen are descendants of the original Gingamen from the Ginga Forest who use a fighting style originating 3,000 years ago and are chosen at a ceremony to become the current Gingamen. Before battle, the team announces their arrival by saying, .

Ryouma 
: A 22-year-old who becomes  with the lion-themed  as his partner to fulfill his older brother Hyuuga's last wish. He is bright, optimistic, and hardworking.

In his civilian form, Ryouma wields a boomerang. With the Lights of Ginga, Ryouma can become . While as Super Armor Shine Ginga Red, he can perform Power Seal and Beast Fire Flash.

Hayate 
He is cool and quick-witted. He is an expert flute player and is the second-in-command. He has a weakness for tomatoes (although this is resolved) and honey. He is engaged to Miharu and always carries the flute and amulet she gave him before leaving the Ginga Forest.

As he is a Wind Warrior, he has the power to eliminate evil sounds whenever he plays his flute. He is rivals with Shelinda after she destroys his flute and has a sword fight with her on the day Hayate and Miharu would have been married. He makes a new flute with similar materials on Moon Mountain. He can also use his flute as a pea-shooter. Later, with the Lights of Ginga, Hayate can become . After the final battle, Hayate is reunited with Miharu.

Gouki 
Gouki is strong, shy and slightly nervous, as well as a lover of forests and wildlife. He is good at cooking. In the show, he believes this aspect of his personality would not let him be a good Gingaman, but at the end, he manages to win the love of Suzuko Miyasawa.

He wields a whip in civilian form. Later, with the Lights of Ginga, Gouki can become . In Gaoranger vs. Super Sentai, he lectures Soutarou Ushigome (GaoBlack) on the many strong warriors of the Super Sentai franchise. He later offers his assistance in the fight against Rakushassa alongside the other Dream Sentai warriors.

Hikaru 
Although he is portrayed as being childish at times, he dislikes for others to treat like a kid. Hikaru is a gluttonous prankster and his favorite food is Mister Donut's donut. It is revealed he has been orphaned since childhood following his parents' death. After the appearance of Biznella, they often fight each other.

In civilian form, he wields a shotgun. Later, with the Lights of Ginga, Hikaru can become .

Saya 
Her admiration for Hyuuga gives her the courage to fight. She is always playing and competing with Hikaru. She loves climbing trees. Saya is strong but also introverted and she is very popular with shopping districts residents.

In civilian form, Saya can wield a slingshot. Later, with the Lights of Ginga, Saya can become .

Hyuuga 
: Ryouma's 27-year-old brother. He was chosen to become the 133rd Ginga Red but fell into a crack in the ground caused by Zahab. He is saved by Bull Black, who possesses Hyuuga's body for a while before discarding him. Soon after, Hyuuga is given the power to become the new  and his partner becomes . When GoTaurus is wounded during the battle against Evil Empress Iliess, he is captured by Pucrates who blackmails Hyuuga to work for him so he could sever his connection to the Earth to wield the cursed Knight Axe, the only thing that can shatter Zahab's Star Soul Jewel. Hyuuga agrees to give up his Earth power in hopes of using the Knight Axe to kill Zahab. Hyuuga regains his Earth power in the finale after the Knight Axe is destroyed and fights as the Black Knight alongside the Gingaman to finally kill Zahab.

Allies

Elder Orghi 
: The leader of the Ginga people. When the Ginga Forest is attacked by Shelinda to use its energy to revive Daitanix, Orghi casts a petrification spell on himself and everything in the forest to prevent her from absorbing its energy, submerging it into the lake. Before becoming fully petrified, Orghi leaves a pendant with a seed to the Gingamen. In the finale after Zahab's death, the Ginga Forest resurfaces and Orghi as well as the rest of the Ginga people are restored, much to the Gingamen's surprise.

Moak 
: Orghi's final gift to the Gingamen before he is turned to stone and is located outside the Silver Star Equestrian Club. Moak senses all the events that happen near any forest or wood, such as Barban's presence. He gives new weapons to the Gingamen. He has knowledge of all Ginga legends. Near the finale, he sacrifices himself to prevent the birth of the Earth Beast and remove the traces of the Extreme Growth Extract which is affecting the Earth and the Gingamen's Earth powers, but he leaves behind a seed. After the Ginga Forest is restored in the finale, Moak is revived when Orghi plants his seed in the Ginga Forest.

Moak is voiced by Rokurō Naya (納谷 六朗 Naya Rokurō).

Bokku 
: A distracted fairy with an acorn-shaped helmet. He is always with Moak and ends every phrase saying "bokku!".

Bokku is voiced by Sanae Miyuki (深雪 さなえ Miyuki Sanae).

Haruhiko Aoyama 
: A writer of children's stories, who believes in the existence of the legendary Ginga Forest. He offers the Gingaman his ranch for them to live in after their forest home is petrified and records their adventures.

Yuuta Aoyama 
: Haruhiko's 9-year-old son. He does not believe the legend until he witnesses the birth of the 133rd Gingamen. In episode 6, he is given GingaLeon's planet stone, which he used in the next episode to stop the Balban from trying to collect the energy the Gingamen was using to revive the Star Beasts.

Suzuko Mizusawa 
: Yuuta's teacher at Wakatake Elementary School. Mizusawa is Gouki's secret love. Gouki had a rivalry with Shunsuke Kishimoto, a teacher from another school, for Suzuko's affections. In the end, Suzuko chooses Gouki and proves it by showing him the bracelet Gouki had made for her.

Misaki Hoshino 
: An acting idol who looks like Saya, except that she has a mole. She is selfish until she talks with Saya. She helps Saya against the Balban.

Misaki Hoshino is also portrayed by Juri Miyazawa.

Arsenal
: The Gingamen's transformation devices, which are activated by turning a dial to a specific color on the brace. The Ginga Braces were given to the original Gingamen by the Star Beasts 3,000 years ago and passed down through the centuries.
: The team's sidearms, which can be used to perform the Gingamen's individual special attacks or be shortened into a dagger when not in use.
: Horses that serve as transportation.
: A white horse ridden by Ginga Red.
: A black horse ridden by Ginga Green.
: A beige horse ridden by Ginga Blue.
: A bay horse ridden by Ginga Yellow.
: A bay horse ridden by Ginga Pink.
: Fang-shaped blades that have varied shapes from member to member. When these five come together, they combine to become a finishing weapon, with the attack . The Kibas draw power from the Star Beasts' planets. The Gingamen channel their Earth power into them to call upon the Star Beasts' power and later to revive them when they were petrified, also obtaining "newly born" power. They help in the five main Star Beasts' transformation into Silver Star Beasts. They can transform into any weapon the Gingamen choose:
: Used by Ginga Red, with its technique Fire Cut.
: Used by Ginga Green, with its technique Blast Shoot.
: Used by Ginga Blue, with its technique Tsunami Hit.
: Used by Ginga Yellow, with their technique Lightning Cut.
: Used by Ginga Pink.
: Created by Moak, they are rods that can be shortened into bazookas by the command, Juugekiha, so the Gingamen can perform the  team attack. Ginga Red uses his Rod in the  attack. Moak creates more advanced rods in episode 47 to fight the Earth Demon Beast. These Rods can be used with the Beast Armor Shine or by the Gingamen in human form.
: Hyuuga's sword that functions as his transformation device, using it to transform into the Black Knight by using the transformation call . Originally belonging to Bull Black, the Bull Riot can be changed into a laser rifle mode. Attacks with multiple slash attacks; including "Black Chop" and "Black Attack".
: An armor upgrade the team receives from the power of the Lights of Ginga. It is summoned by the command , but all five Gingamen need to be present for it to work.
: Upgraded from the Star Beast Swords.
: A brace with two claw-like blades that is worn on the left forearm.
: With the knowledge from the deceased Bull Black that the Lights of Ginga can change shape depending on the user's will, the Gingaman, while in Shining Beast Armor form, can gather the Lights of Ginga to create the Galeo Pulsar, a motorcycle that is themed after Ginga Red's Star Beast GingaLeon. When summoned, it temporarily removes the Beast Armor enhancements from the Gingamen. Its attack is the Lion War Blast, while its finisher is the  where it rams into its target with the flaming Lights of Ginga energy. After a Majin is defeated, the Galeo Pulsar changes back into the Gingamans' Beast Armor enhancements, which are then returned to them.
: A cursed weapon that Hyuuga receives from Bucrates that has the power to destroy the Star Soul Jewel that sustains Zahab. As Hyuuga had sacrificed his Earth power, only he can wield it as Ryouma once tried to pick it up in Episode 41, only for the energy feedback from the Axe caused him great pain. The Knight Axe is destroyed by Zahab in the finale, but not before damaging his Star Soul Jewel.

Starbeasts 
The Starbeasts (星獣 Seijū) are sentient beings, originally from different planets (Galeon, Galcon, Garilla, Gaverick, Gat, Taurus, Rhinos, Phoenix and Bitus). They help the Gingaman. The Gingaman's Earth power increases when man and beast combine. When the Gingaman channel the energy of the Star Beasts' home planet through their Kiba Swords the first five Star Beasts are able to transform into Silver Star Beasts (銀星獣 Ginseijū) by the command "Great Rebirth, Silver Star Beasts!" (大転生銀星獣 Daitensei Ginseijū).

The planets of Star Beasts GingaRhinos, GingaPhoenix and GingaBitus were destroyed by the Barban long before. They were converted into Steel Star Beasts (鋼星獣 Kōseijū) by Biznella under his control when they were rendered dormant. After recharging them with the Lights of Ginga, Biznella set them against the Gingamen. The fact that they were Star Beasts made Super Armor Shine Gingaioh and Bull Taurus reluctant to fight them. However, the Steel Star Beasts were freed from their programming by the brotherhood of their fellow Star Beasts on the night of the "Star Festival". They then destroyed Biznella near the finale. They aided the Gingamen in many of their battles. However, in the Gingaman vs. Megaranger special, Giga Rhinos and Giga Phoenix bid farewell to the Gingamen after fighting Ghelmadix. Giga Bitus is not killed after two of them are sacrificed.

Following the arrival of Grandiene in 1999, the Star Beasts became dormant under the sea, but Dr. Tatsumi locates them in time to help the Gingamen help GoGoFive to battle the Dark Beast with Hyuuga's assistance who uses his power to revive them.

 Starbeast Ginga Leon (星獣ギンガレオン Seijū Ginga Reon) is the red lion-like beast of flame. Its attack is Strong Flame. It appears whenever Ginga Red calls out "Ginga Leon!". A native of the field planet Galeon, it gives Yuuta its planet stone as a sign of their friendship. It later gains the ability to become Silver Starbeast Ginga Leon (銀星獣ギンガレオン Ginseijū Gingareon), with an attack called Silver Flame. It helps out in Gaoranger vs. Super Sentai.
 Starbeast Gingalcon (星獣ギンガルコン Seijū Gingarukon) is the green dragon and falcon hybrid beast of wind. Its attack is Roaring Cyclone. Comes whenever Ginga Green calls out "Gingalcon!". It is a native of the wind planet Galcon. It later gains the ability to become Silver Starbeast Gingalcon (銀星獣ギンガルコン Ginseijū Gingarukon), with an attack called Silver Cyclone.
 Starbeast Gingarilla (星獣ギンガリラ Seijū Gingarira) is the blue gorilla-like beast of water. Its attack is Mighty Strength. It appears whenever Ginga Blue calls out "Gingarilla!". It is native to the hidden forest planet Garilla. It gains the ability to become Silver StarbeastGingarilla (銀星獣ギンガリラ Ginseijū Gingarira), with an attack called Silver Blizzard. The toy version stores the Gingaioh fists in its feet.
 Starbeast Ginga Verick (星獣ギンガベリック Seijū Ginga Berikku) is the yellow wolf-like beast of thunder. Its attack is Strong Electric Shock. It comes whenever Ginga Yellow calls out "Ginga Verick!". It is a native of the forest planet Gaverick. It later gains the ability to become Silver Starbeast Ginga Verick (銀星獣ギンガベリック Ginseijū Gingaberikku), with an attack called Silver Flash (used with Gingat).
 Starbeast Gingat (星獣ギンガット Seijū Gingatto) is the pink wildcat-like beast of flowers. Her attack is Flower Bullet. She appears whenever Ginga Pink calls out "Gingat!". She is a native of the sand planet Gat and loves sweet-tasting things. She later gains the ability to become Silver Starbeast Gingat (銀星獣ギンガット Ginseijū Gingatto), with an attack called Silver Flash (used with Ginga Verick). A gemstone falls from the sky one night and lands near Gingat, turning her into a small kitten, while absorbing her power. A little girl, Yuuko, who was looking for her kitty found the small-sized Gingat, naming her "Mii". The Gingaman track down Gingat, but out of sorrow, Saya leaves Gingat with Yuuko. Yuuko then realizes Gingat was needed for battle and breaks the gemstone, restoring Gingat.
 Heavy Starbeast Gou Taurus (重星獣ゴウタウラス Jūseijū Gō Taurasu) is the Black Knight's bull-like partner and appears when the Black Knight calls out "Gou Taurus!". It is a native of the dead planet Taurus. It transforms the Black Knight into the giant Heavy Knight BullBlack (重騎士ブルブラック Jū Kishi Buru Burakku), where he is armed with two Bullsword (ブルソード Burusōdo) lances and can perform the Cross Fire Slash (クロスファイヤー斬り Kurosu Faiyā Kiri). During the fight against Illies, Gou Taurus is seriously injured and cannot fight in the next few episodes. It forms a bodysuit for Heavy Knight when forming Bull Taurus.
 Steel Starbeast Giga Rhinos (鋼星獣ギガライノス Kōseijū Giga Rainosu) was formerly the red humanoid rhinoceros-like beast Starbeast GingaRhinos (星獣ギンガライノス Seijū Ginga Rainosu), but now is a red-armored robot whose body can break into the five Giga Wheels (ギガホイール Giga Hoīru), only to reform as one again through its "Beast-Land Fusion" (獣陸合体 Jūriku Gattai). It is a native of the dead planet Rhinos. It uses its powerful Gigantis Buster (ギガンティスバスター Gigantisu Basutā) cannon in battle. It combines with Phoenix for an energy cyclone attack. Giga Wheel 1 forms Giga Rhinos' head and back and the "clip" of the Gigantis Buster that is stored between the "feet" of Giga Bitus' Scramble Mode. Giga Wheel 2 forms Giga Rhinos' upper torso and the "generator" of the Gigantis Buster that is stored in the left "foot" of Giga Bitus's Scramble Mode, to Giga Wheel 3's left. Giga Wheel 3 forms Giga Rhinos' waist and the "frame" of the Gigantis Buster that is stored in the left "foot" of Giga Bitus' Scramble Mode, to Giga Wheel 2's right and Giga Wheel 4's left. Giga Wheel 4 forms Giga Rhinos' arms and the muzzles of the Gigantis Buster. Stored in the left "foot" of Giga Bitus' Scramble Mode, to Giga Wheel 3's right. Giga Wheel 5 forms Giga Rhinos' helmet and legs and the "barrel" of the Gigantis Buster that is stored in the right "foot" of Giga Bitus' Scramble Mode. Giga Rhinos is known to have sharp concentration. Giga Rhinos was later destroyed along with Giga Phoenix in battle with Ghelmadix.
 Steel Starbeast Giga Phoenix (鋼星獣ギガフェニックス Kōseijū Giga Fenikkusu) was formerly the blue phoenix-like beast Starbeast GingaPhoenix (星獣ギンガフェニックス Seijū GingaFenikkusu), but now is a blue-armored robot whose body can break into five Giga Wings (ギガウイング Giga Uingu), only to reform as one again through its "Beast-Sky Fusion" (獣空合体 Jūkū Gattai). It is a native of the dead planet Phoenix. With its weapon, the Giganic Boomerang (ギガニックブーメラン Giganikku Būmeran), it aids the Gingamen in many battles. It combines with Rhinos for an energy cyclone attack. Giga Wing 1 forms Giga Phoenix's head and arm and is stored in Giga Bitus' jaw, ahead of Giga Wings 2 and 3. Giga Wing 2 forms Giga Phoenix's body. Stored in Giga Bitus' jaw, left of Giga Wing 1. Giga Wing 3 forms Giga Phoenix's helmet, waist and upper legs and is stored in Giga Bitus' jaw, right of Giga Wing 1. Giga Wing 4 forms Giga Phoenix's right leg and is stored in the right "arm" of Giga Bitus' Scramble Mode. Giga Wing 5 forms Giga Phoenix's left leg. Stored in the left "arm" of Giga Bitus' Scramble Mode. Giga Phoenix is known to have a calm edge aesthetic, which makes him a good choice to battle Majins with overwhelming great strength. Giga Phoenix was later destroyed along with Giga Rhinos in battle with Ghelmadix.
 Giant Starbeast Beast Giga Bitus (巨大鋼星獣ギガバイタス Kyodai Kōseijū Giga Baitasu) was formerly a silver shark-like beast Starbeast GingaBitus (星獣ギンガバイタス Seijū GingaBaitasu), now serves as a mother ship for his fellow Steel Star Beasts. It is a native of the dead planet Bitus. Transforms from Cruiser Mode (クルーザーモード Kurūzā Mōdo) to Scramble Mode (スクランブルスモード Sukuranburu Mōdo), armed with the Bitus Cannon (バイタスキャノン Baitasu Kyanon). Usually chooses to send Giga Rhinos for his sharp concentration, or Giga Phoenix for his calm edge aesthetic, whenever the Gingamen and their Star Beasts need their help

Starbeast Combinations

Gingaioh 
Star Beast Combination Galaxy Beast Warrior Gingaioh (星獣合体 銀河獣士ギンガイオー Seijū Gattai Ginga Jūshi Gingaiō) is a giant robot formed from the Star Beasts. It is armed with the Silver-Armor Sword (銀鎧剣 Gingaiken) and the Galcon Bowgun (ガルコンボーガン Garukon Bōgan), a bowgun formed from Gingalcon.

Ginga Leon becomes the torso and head. Gingarilla becomes the legs, Gingalcon becomes the back, waist & the crossbow and lastly Ginga Verick & Gingat becomes the shoulders & arms. Its finishing attacks are Galaxy Beast King Cut (銀河獣王斬り Gingajūō Kiri) and Shooting Star Bullet (流星弾 Ryūseidan), in which Gingaioh fires the Galcon Bowgun to destroy a monster. It can also fire the Silver Flower Bullet from Gingat's face which became the shoulder and fire the Silver Flame from the lion's face.

Later, when the Gingaman receives the power of the Lights of Ginga, it enables Gingaioh to become Super Armor Shine Gingaioh (超装光ギンガイオー Chōsōkō Gingaiō). This is where Gingaioh receives an armored chestplate and head and the Silver Armor Sword's power is enhanced, becoming the Super Silver-Armor Sword (超銀鎧剣 Chogingaiken). Its finishing attack is the Great Galaxy Beast King Cut (銀河大獣王斬り Ginga Daijūō Kiri). A variant that was used to finish off the Demon Beast Daitanix, is the Galaxy Beast King Unrelenting Cut (Ginga Juo Ougi Kiri).

In the final episode, to defeat the Earth Demon Beast, Super Armor Shine Gingaioh's power is enhanced by Ginga Red's flame ability with attacks such as Galaxy Beast King Flaming Cut (銀河獣王火炎斬り Gingajūō Kaen Kiri), Flaming Shooting Star Bullet (火炎流星弾 Kaen Ryuseidan) and Great Galaxy Flame (ギンガ大火炎 Ginga Daikaen) (enhanced by Giga Rhinos and Giga Phoenix).

BullTaurus 
 is created by the command . Gou Taurus forms a bodysuit for Heavy Knight when doing so – the rear legs become the legs, the front legs become the arms and the neck swings up to reveal the head.

In this form both of Heavy Knight's Bullswords are combined into a single  which Bull Taurus uses for the  finisher. Later in the series, after Hyuuga receives the Knight Axe, he also gains the ability to use it as BullTaurus and can use it to perform the  technique.

Space Pirates Balban 
The  are a group of space pirates who have destroyed many planets along the Milky Way. They once tried to invade Earth 3,000 years ago, but the first generation of Gingamen and the Starbeasts sealed them at the bottom of the sea. In the present day, an earthquake breaks the seal and releases the Balban, who plan to reawaken Daitanix. Its four great armies plot various strategies to achieve it.

: The leader of the Balban. Cruel and violent but at the same time a great strategist and expert warrior who became immortal thanks to a Star Soul Jewel created by Daitanix, using the monster to gather a crew by offering them long life. Zahab's left hand is missing, as a result of the battle sustained with the first generation Ginga Red three thousand years earlier. He has replaced it with a cannon integrated hook. As a result, Zahab has a grudge against those who take the mantle of Ginga Red, including Ryouma. Hearing the death of an underling does not seem to affect him, but deep inside he suffers in private. Eventually, having known of Shelinda's death, Zahab can not take it anymore and falls apart in grief. In the final battle he uses the castle to take control of the Earth Demon Beast, but Zahab is forced to flee from his castle when it is destroyed by BullTaurus. After losing the Earth Beast, Zahab fights and beats the tar out of the Gingamen, until Ginga Red and Black Knight use their fire ability to destroy his Star Soul Jewel. He is then killed by the Black Knight's Black Chop, the Gingamens' Galaxy War Radiance, and finally by Super Armor Shine Ginga Red's Beast Fire Flash attack as the final blow. He is later resurrected by Gregory, only to be killed once again by the Gingamen in the Galaxy Lights armor in Seijuu Sentai Gingaman vs. Megaranger.  Zahab is voiced by Hidekatsu Shibata (柴田 秀勝 Shibata Hidekatsu), who previously voiced Daimaoh in Ninja Sentai Kakuranger.
: An old friend of Zahab's who came to Earth to revive the Barban, with the aid of Hizumina, Dr. Hinelar's second "daughter". He had his own personal Majin, Ghelmadix, which was originally a second Daitanix. According to Moku, Gregory was sealed by the Starbeasts long before the Balban, feared as much as they were, all on his own. He could make himself grow without the aid of an enchanted liquid. Eventually revived every Barban member along with almost every Majin. He was killed by Galaxy Mega & Super Armor Shine GingaiOh.  Gregory is voiced by Seizō Katō (加藤 精三 Katō Seizō), who previously voiced Dai Satan in Kyōryū Sentai Zyuranger.
: The cruel and selfish second-in-command and the navigator of the Balban. A warrior with a sword and shell-themed armor, Shelinda had romantic feelings for Budoh though never forgave him for saving her life sometime in the past. During the Sutoiji incident, Shelinda destroys Hayate's flute before later attempting to stop him from making a new one. After finding him as Sutoiji is defeated, Shelinda duels Ginga Green with it ending with her forearm scarred as she vows a vendetta on him to the point of not allowing her own comrades to deny her killing Hayate. The most anxious to see Daitanix revived as her position of Steerwoman was pointless without Daitanix to steer often going to the aid of a Majin to speed along the revival. Shelinda is eventually killed in a final duel with Hayate in episode 49, where only her sword remained, to which the Yartots deliver it to Zahab to inform him of Shelinda's death. The sword itself was later destroyed along with Zahab's castle. Shelinda is later revived by Gregory, and is killed once again by the Gingaman in the Galaxy Lights armor in Seijuu Sentai Gingaman vs. Megaranger.
: A stout little being with a barrel-shaped body, Bucrates lacks battle skills, though he makes up for it with his extensive knowledge. He is called  by Zahab and is the one who gave Zahab an immortal body. Prior to Sambash named acting general, Bucrates supported his niece Illiess in taking on the position from the start. While Budoh was acting general, Bucrates felt humiliated by the general after his numerous attempts to upstage Budoh. He proceeds to conspire with Iliess to frame Budou so she can become acting general. Though it seemed they got away with it, it turned out Zahab knew of the plot yet allowed Bucrates to remain until Illiess's death. Attempting to resurrect Illiess in secret, Bucrates is mortally wounded by Zahab and wrapped in chains as he is sent to a watery grave. However, his newfound hatred for Zahab allowed Bucrates to survive the ocean pressure while changing into a new form called . Escaping his binds, Bucrates vows revenge on the Balban, capturing the wounded GoTaurus in a small barrel to get Hyuuga's assistance. Bucrates later let GoTaurus out temporarily to have Hyuuga aid the Gingamen against Daitanix in episode 42, before drawing them both back when the battle was over. However, Bucrates is mortally wounded in episode 48, by Shelinda for his betrayal, before he can see his revenge fulfilled and subsequently commits suicide in episode 49 with a bomb to give Hyuuga a chance to escape with GoTaurus after giving the barrel back to Hyuuga.

The Balban Army Generals 
Four of the strongest Majins, they each lead one of Zahab's four armies. Due to quarrels in the past that caused them to be sealed away, Zahab has only one General-in-command form a plan at a time.

: A hot-headed gunman who carries a pistol and rides a motorcycle with cannons. His Majin are based on insects. 3,000 years ago, Bull Black had come to Earth to hide the Galaxy Lights and Sambash cornered him to learn where they were hidden. Bull Black gave him the key of an empty chest and a fake location in Cape Kagerou, with Sambash keeping this information from Zahab. Being the first general chosen to revive it, Sambash attempts to find ways of providing energy for Daitanix to revive. After continuous failures to revive Daitanix and defeat the Gingamen, Sambash decided to go after the Galaxy Lights by first having Neikaa open up the cave at Cape Kagerou where the box containing the lights was hidden. Unable to open the entrance without an Earth user, Sambash has Gurinjii assume Hyuga's form to trick Ryouma into fetching it for him. As Gurinjii is destroyed by GingaiOh, heavily wounded from his fight with Ginga Red, Sambash opens the box to use the Lights of Ginga on himself to even the odds. However, finding it empty and with nothing to lose, a crazed Sambash climbs onto his bike to run over Ginga Red. In the process, after being hit by Ginga Red's attack, Sambash drives off a cliff as his motorcycle explodes, destroying both itself and him. He is later resurrected by Gregory, only to be killed once again by the Gingamen in the Galaxy Lights armor in Seijuu Sentai Gingaman vs. Megaranger.  Sambash is voiced by Nobuyuki Hiyama (檜山 修之 Hiyama Nobuyuki), who previously voiced Boss Kamikaze in Gosei Sentai Dairanger and Bomber the Great in Chouriki Sentai Ohranger.
: A calm swordsman who became the second Barban General-in-command chosen. Budoh has a mostly white and blue outfit with manta ray-like wings as a partial cape bearing his army's emblem. He possesses the Girasame sword, with which he can perform his "Girasame Cruel Sword" attack. Budoh has a strong sense of honor and loyalty that even Zahab recognized despite being unpredictable. His Majin are traditional Japanese Samurai culture and sea creature based. Budoh was always well-mannered and thanked his fallen Majin, who called him "My Grand General". He takes over the search for the Galaxy Light to revive Daitanix after Sambash dies, using a scroll of potential hosts that might contain the Light. With only one entry left, with his life endanged, Budoh sends his most powerful servant, Dotoumusha, to retrieve the Galaxy Light with success. However, Budoh is set up by Bucrates and Iliess to be made as a treasonous cur wanting the Light for himself. Placed in the brig, unable to perform Seppuku for an act he never even did, Budoh escapes to clear his name and kill the Gingamen to reclaim the Galaxy Light. But once learning the truth of Iliess framing him, seeing that nothing would ever clear his name, Budoh kills Medoumedou before arriving to his ninjas' aid to fight Juusoukou Ginga Red to the death. After being mortally wounded by Juusoukou Ginga Red's Juukasen, attempting to resist his injuries, Budoh meets his end and dies in a blaze of glory with Girasame landing near the riverbed. In Seijuu Sentai Gingaman vs. Megaranger, he is revived and killed once again by the Gingaman in the Galaxy Lights armor.  Budoh is voiced by Kazuo Hayashi (林 一夫 Hayashi Kazuo), who previously voiced Bio Hunter Silva in Choudenshi Bioman.
: An Egyptian-themed, spiteful, and ambitious sorceress, motivated by her greed and demanding monetary compensation upon a successful plan. Her majin are based around entities from different cultural mythologies. Illiess is also immortal as she can resurrect herself no matter the number of times she is killed as long as her Soul Gem is unharmed. Having become impatient with waiting, Illiess conspired with her uncle Bucrates to depose Budoh so she can become the new active general. Having succeeded, Illiess intended to revive Daitanix through various forms of sorcery and mass sacrifices so she can obtain the riches Zahab offered for the monster's resurrection. However, after losing the Koseijuu, Illiess is given additional incentive to revive Daitanix when Zaihab decides to reduce her earnings for each day she fails her objective. After the death of her younger brother Desphias, Illiess is forced to take matters into her own hands. Erecting a tower in the city's plaza, Illiess conjures lizards to suck the blood of 9,999 people to revive Daitanix. When the Gingamen arrive, Illiess absorbs the souls of her fallen Majin to assume a powerful chimera-like fighting form called . As the other Gingamen and Hyuga fight copies of Morgumorgu, Hielahiela, Garagara, Wangawanga, and Burakiburaki, Ryouma battles Illiess and destroys the tower. Defeated by the Supershine Gingamen and Black Knight, Iliess refuses to stand down and uses her magic to enlarge herself. Illiess then overpowers Super Armor Shine GingaiOh and BullTaurus before the Kouseiju's interference leads to her death by the Seijuu. Though Bucrates attempts to revive her, Iliess's soul gem is shattered by Batobas and used to resurrect Daitanix.  Illiess is voiced by Gara Takashima (高島 雅羅 Takashima Gara).
: The strongest among the four generals and a weapons specialist as well. He is considered by Zahab to be "his right arm" which suggests a longer relationship between them than the rest of the generals. His Majin are based on weapons and machines. Revealing Daitanix's condition and using Iliess's soul to delay the rotting, Battobas is last general chosen to fight the Gingaman with the mission to gain enough energy to fully revive Daitanix, sometimes having Biznella plot the plan while he would provide the Majin and Yartots. Battobas succeeded, but upon Daitanix's destruction, he is later sent to find the Earth Beast to mature and/or empower it fully with an Extreme Growth Extract. He succeeds, but ends up being eaten alive by the monster in episode 49. He is revived and killed once again by the Gingaman in the Galaxy Lights armor in Seijuu Sentai Gingaman vs. Megaranger.  Battobas is voiced by Takeshi Watabe (渡部 猛 Watabe Takeshi), who previously voiced Emperor Aton in Kagaku Sentai Dynaman and Bookback in Kyōryū Sentai Zyuranger.
: An evil Black Marketeer. He captured three Starbeasts and turned them into cyborgs, before selling them to the Balban for a payment of five boys of gold coins. After his merchandise fails, Biznella is recruited into Balban, as a consultant of sorts under the service of Battobas, who he had been acquainted with previously. During one of their attempts to find the Demon Earth Beast, Biznella is thrown into the Extreme Growth Extract by accident and mutates into  who overpowers the Gingamen until they defeated him with their upgraded Beast Attack Rods. He is then betrayed and enlarged by Battobas, and is killed by GigaRhinos, GigaPhoenix, and Super Armor Shine GingaiOh in episode 47.  Biznella is voiced by Kaneto Shiozawa (塩沢 兼人 Shiozawa Kaneto).
: Balban's foot soldiers, orange with striped shorts and wielding sabers. When fighting, they would only say "Yartot!" but can speak when talking to their superiors.

Majin 
The Majin (魔人 Majin, Demon Men) are criminals and mercenaries who, drawn by the evil energy of Daitanix, are recruited by Balban. They are divided in four armies depending on their home galaxy and the strongest member of each is appointed General. These four armies tend to fight with each other, being this one of the reasons of their defeat against Gingaman 3,000 years earlier. Knowing this, Zahab decides that this time the plans would be executed by one army at the time, avoiding inner conflicts. When defeated, the Majin will draw a bottle (its design depends on the army the Majin belongs to) containing Balba-X (バルバエキス Baruba Ekisu), a potion that enlarges them, but that also shortens their life, making Balba-X a last resort in battle. Many of them are revived and killed by the Megarangers & the Gingaman in Seijuu Sentai Gingaman vs. Megaranger.

Sambash Majin Gang 
The Sambash Majin Gang (サンバッシュ魔人団 Sanbasshu Majin Dan) are bug-based Majin that dress in leather, like biker punks. They're the first army to fight. Their primary objective is find a way to revive Daitanix. Their Balba-X container is a liquor bottle, and their symbol is a wing pin.

 Kolshizer (コルシザー Korushizā, 2, 19, Gingaman vs. Megaranger): A pistol-wielding scorpion Majin who played a part in destruction of the planet Taurus. Tends to say "baby" a lot, and Has an Elvis Presley-like hairstyle. Kolshizer is hired to find an energy source on Earth to awaken Daitanix. Therefore, he targeted gasoline fuel from inside cars. He and the Yartots destroyed a lot of cars and caused a lot of damage while trying to accomplish this theft, before being stopped by the Gingaman. Kolshizer's attack lead to the debut of the Star Beasts, where he was killed by the GingaLeon's flaming breath. Kolshizer is later revived and killed once again by the Megarangers in Seijuu Sentai Gingaman vs. Megaranger. Voiced by Takeji Yoshihara.
 Rigurou (リグロー Rigurō, 3): A flea-like Majin who tried to find a heat-based energy source for the Daitanix's awakening. Rigurou can absorb the heat from people and locations, using the absorbers on the palms of his hands. This process would turn the people into frozen shells and the locations into frozen wastelands. Though he didn't wield a weapon, he could blast flamethrowers from the heat absorbers. He is killed by the GingaLeon's flaming breath after being thrashed by the other Starbeasts, including Gingalcon's tornado attack. Voiced by Hidenari Ugaki.
 Dreddredder (ドレッドレッダー Doreddōreddā, 4): A centipede-like Majin who tried to awaken Daitanix with electrical shocks, via an electrical-based energy source. Dreddredder could drain the electricity out of objects using his many legs and even wielded an electrified whip. He is killed by the GingaVerick and Gingalcon's combined teamwork and attacks. Voiced by Takao Ishi
 Bucter (バクター Bakutā, 5, Gingaman vs. Megaranger): A weevil Majin, Bucter is an expert at stealing and collecting weapons, obtaining the Kiba Blades from the 1st Gingamen 3,000 years earlier. Pucrates accidentally broke the Great Darkness Sword, a weapon thought to be able to revive Daitanix, via its energy, as it had rusted over many centuries. Bucter is then summoned to create a new 2nd Great Darkness Sword by gathering 555 weapons. However, Bucter was reluctant to give up the Seijuuken and the Kibas in Sambash's scheme. His reluctance resulted with the Gingaman taking back both weapon sets. Bucter is defeated at the hands of the Kibas before being killed by the GingaLeon's flaming breath. He is revived by Gregory and killed once again by the Megarangers in Seijuu Sentai Gingaman vs. Megaranger. Voiced by Kōji Tobe
 Tagredor (タグレドー Taguredō, 6-7): A stag beetle Majin who can convert anything he eats, namely concrete, into a poison gas. He shoots said gas fumes through his pinchers, also known as his Poison Shot attack. He tried to turn Earth into a contaminated planet, like Zahab's home planet of Dera, hoping that the fumes would revive Daitanix. During one of his attacks, though unable to use his poison, due to Bucrates spraying him with an antidote, Tagredor manages to poison Yuuta, before having his pinchers cleaned, preventing him from covering Tokyo with his toxic fumes. However, the Starbeasts sacrificed themselves, absorbing the poison, to save the city, which neutralized the Majin's power. After being driven off by the Gingamen, Tagredor is sent back to destroy them, now wielding a mallet, and being aided by his brother Torbador. However, the Starbeasts were revived and Tagredor became the first to be killed by Gingaioh's Galaxy Beast King Cut. Voiced by Kenichi Sakaguchi
 Torbador (トルバドー Torubadō, 7, 19, Gingaman vs. Megaranger): Tagredor's older brother and a rhino beetle Majin who was present during the attack on Planet Taurus. He is able to fire beams from the gun-like tip of his horn. When the Starbeasts are briefly petrified, he and his brother are sent to destroy them to make an awakening potion for Daitanix out of their remains. However, the StarBeasts were revived and Torbador is the first to be destroyed by Gingaioh's Shooting Star Bullet. He is killed once again by the Megarangers, after being revived by Gregory in Seijuu Sentai Gingaman vs. Megaranger. Voiced by Takuro Kitagawa
 Dolmar (ドルマー Dorumā, 8): A pillbug Majin who wields giant eating utensils as weapons and has a very hard shell on his back, which protected him from several attacks made by the Gingaman. He is sent to find a good chef whose food samples could revive Daitanix. While running from the Gingamen, Dolmar runs into an old lady Hikaru befriended and later kidnaps her. However, Hikaru stops him as Ginga Yellow manages to defeat him. After enlarging, Dolmar's shell is shattered before he is destroyed by Gingaioh. Voiced by Takeshi Kuwabara
 Mandiger (マンディガー Mandigā, 9, 19, Gingaman vs. Megaranger): A mantis Majin who is originally armed with the High Speed Majin Swords (高速魔人剣 Kōsoku Majin Ken), which were used like dowsing rods, and was present during the attack on Planet Taurus. Mandigger is sent after a meteorite that contains the sealed power of Gingat. Sambash and Zahab wanted to use this sealed power to revive Daitanix. Forced to retreat from the Gingamen, Mandiger later receives a scythe and uses it to distract the male Gingamen while Sambash goes after the meteorite. As Gingagat regains her power, Mandigger is defeated by Ginga Red as he is forced to drink Barba-X before being destroyed by Gigaioh. He is killed once again by the Megarangers in Seijuu Sentai Gingaman vs. Megaranger. Voiced by Eiji Maruyama
 Sutoijii (ストイジー Sutoijī, 10): A cicada Majin who can blast powerful sound waves from the speakers on his shoulders. He is sent to create a loud enough racket from the surrounding noise to awaken Diatanix. However, Hayate's flute playing negates the noise, before Ginga Red destroys the Majin's conducting rod. Returning with Sambash, and with a blade, Sutoiji resumes his concert, as he battles the Gingamen, until Hayate's new flute cancels the sound and his new weapon is also destroyed. After being defeated, Sutoiji enlarges and is destroyed by Gingaioh. Voiced by Hiroshi Otake
 Neikaa (ネイカー Neikā, 11, Gingaman vs. Megaranger): A wasp Majin armed with a rapier. He uses Seismic Needles to create points to cause earthquakes the next day, in order to open the cave leading to the presumed resting place of the Galaxy Lights. When Ginga Blue arrives and defeats him, Neikar drinks Balba-X, as he battles Gingarilla, before Gingaioh destroys him with the Galcon Bowgun. Voiced by Fumihiko Inoue
 Gurinjii (グリンジー Gurinjī, 12): A cockroach Majin who poses as Hyuuga to trick Ryouma into opening the cavern to the Ginga Lights box. After Ryouma obtained the box that the Lights were supposedly in, Hyuuga knocked Ryouma out and took the box. Hyuuga returns to Sambash with the box and revealed his true form. He wields a sword in battle. He eventually grew and was destroyed fighting Gingaioh. Voiced by Tōru Ōkawa

Budoh Majin Mob 
The Budoh Majin Mob (ブドー魔人衆 Budō Majin Shū) are marine creature-based Majin in feudal Japanese attire and masters of the Majin Arts. They begin activities after Sambash reveals the existence of the Galaxy Lights and their mission is to find them. After having been defeated by the Gingamen, the Budoh Majin draw the Balba-X and "pay their last service". Their Balba-X container is a hyoutan, a gourd-like container and their symbol is a diamond-shaped image of a sunrise.

 Komuhachi (虚無八 Komuhachi, 2, 12-13, Gingaman vs. Megaranger) is an octopus-like Komusō Majin who is master of the Majin Art: Phantom Dance (魔人寸法幻の舞 Majin Sunpō Maboroshi no Mai). After being unable to represent his master when Sambash was picked instead of him, Komuhachi is sent by Budoh to keep an eye on Sambash, during Sambash's final mission. After his master is selected to carry out Balban's mission, Komhachi use his shakuhachi to infect the trees with mold to force the Galaxy Lights out of them, putting Moak in danger, thus the Juugekibou weapons were revealed, when Moak used his power to infuse their power within five nuts, leading to their creation. He is killed by Gingaioh and again by Ginga Red in Seijuu Sentai Gingaman vs. Megaranger. Voiced by Toshihide Tsuchiya
 Fudasoushou (札僧正 Fudasōshō, 14) is a squid-like priest Majin who Budoh sends to destroy cameras in hopes of finding the Galaxy Lights by tossing explosive talismans that would latch onto their targets. While attacking the shooting of Misaki Hoshino, he puts a cursed seal on Saya's leg, at one point, making her unable to fight him. However, with Misaki's help, Saya catches Fudasoushou off guard to destroy his talismans. After drinking Balba-X, upon being hit with the Beast Attack Cannons, Fudosoushou is destroyed by Gingaioh's Galcon Bowgun. Voiced by Hisnori Nemoto
 Kemuemon (煙ェ門 Kemuemon, 15, Gingaman vs. Megaranger) is a goofy sea urchin-like, ninja bandit Majin sent by Budoh, to find antiques and, with his pipe-like staff, smoke out the Galaxy Lights. He targets a 3,000-year-old Balban bomb, which ended up being swallowed by Hikaru by accident. Kemuemon pursues Ryouma and Hikaru, believing they're hiding the artifact. Once the bomb is destroyed, by the waters of the Cancellation Falls, Kemuemon is defeated by Ginga Red and Ginga Yellow and then destroyed by Gingaioh. Revived, Kemuemon is killed once again by the Megarangers, in the movie. Voiced by Hironori Miyata.
 Amehoshi (雨法師 Amehōshi, 16) is a catfish-like, shamisen playing Majin, who uses his instrument as a multi-purpose weapon, as he looks for the Galaxy Lights. By conducting a ceremony, in which he summoned cursed storm clouds to soak the ground with a rain that absorbs life, and once the rains stopped, Amehoshi attempted to summon the Galaxy Lights, with his shamisen, while causing the ground to melt. He battles the Gingamen, when they intervene, and is defeated by them, with the Juugekiha attack. Drinking Barba X, Amehoshi is killed by Gingaioh. Voiced by Kaoru Shinoda
 Kugutsudayuu (傀儡太夫 Kugutsudayū, 17) is a starfish-like, engineer Majin who wields a cog-like chakram. He is deployed by Budoh to use his explosive android puppets to infiltrate skyscrapers and self-destruct to destroy the buildings to force the Galaxy Lights out. When Yuta finds his base of operations, he leads Ryouma there while the others battle Budoh as they intercept the dolls. After the machine that creates his dolls is destroyed while being mortally wounded by Ginga Red, Kugutsudayuu sics his creations on Ryouma as he staggers to Budoh's side to beg for forgiveness before drinking Barba-X. He is killed by a combo attack by GingaVerick, Gingat, Gingarilla, and Gingalcon. Voiced by Takkou Ishimori
 Kairikibou (壊力坊 Kairikibō, 18, Gingaman vs. Megaranger) is a strong red and white Majin with coral-like growths all over his body, using a spear as a weapon and able to fire a beam from his mouth. He is deployed by Budoh to find the most indestructible item that supposedly contains the Galaxy Lights, Kairikibou finds the "Oni Stone", an unbreakable artifact stone. Stealing the stone in midst of the Gingamen's fight with Bull Black, Kairikibou's attempt to smash the stone with a sledgehammer failed as he sends a challenge to the Gingamen meet him in Himokudari in hopes their Juugekibou can do the job. When he attempts to kill them for failing to meet his expectations, Bull Black arrives and engages the Majin in a duet that ended with the shattered Oni Stone empty. On the verge of death, Karikibou uses his last moments to drink the Balban-X to kill Bullblack, only to be stopped and destroyed by Gingaioh. He is killed again by the Megarangers in the movie after being revived. Voiced by Takashi Nagasako
 Yamimaru and Onimaru (鬼丸&闇丸 Yamimaru to Onimaru, 24, Gingaman vs. Megaranger) are a green shark-like and a red hammerhead shark-like Majin ninja brothers. Onimaru is able to perform Majin Ninja Art Confusion Jutsu that has his victim see only enemies. Though Yamimaru and Oniimaru attempted to clear their master's name, they choose to follow their master in death by Super Armor Shine Gingaioh. The brothers are killed once again by Ginga Red in the crossover movie, after being revived by Gregory and the others. Voiced by Kazuhiro Oguro and Bunkō Ogata.
 Budoh Four Shoguns (ブドー四将軍 Budō Yon Shōgun, 19-23): After Bull Black's return, Budoh brings out his best Majin to help deal with him, and find the Galaxy Lights, which they do.
 Sunabakutou (砂爆盗 Sunabakutō, 19) is a scorpionfish-like Majin, utilizing "Explosive Sand" from his pouch onto objects. He is one of the Majin who played a role in the death of Krantz. Sunabakutou is deployed by Budoh to destroy any sun-shaped statue that would hold the Galaxy Lights. While attacking the Museum of Modern Sculpture, Sunabakuto engages Bull Black with civilian casualties. When the statue fails to hold the Lights, he goes after another statue in the park. When Bull Black attacks, he holds the girl hostage to keep him and the Gingamen from attacking him. With the Gingamen managing to get the child from Sunabakuto, Bull Black defeats the Majin. After finding his target empty upon destroying it with his entire bag, Sunabakuto drinks Balban-X and overpowers Gingaioh. However, the sudden appearance of GouTaurus turns the tables as Sunabakuto is destroyed by Bull Taurus. Voiced by Maroshi Tamura.
 Hyoudogasa (氷度笠 Hyōdogasa, 20) is a jellyfish-like Majin who is deployed by Budoh to put humans to sleep by throwing his extra Kasa and releasing thousands of ice stingers down onto them in his Dream Goal (夢ゴール Yume Gōru) ability in hopes that the Lights of Ginga manifest. Also attacks with his Merciless Drawing Slash (抜刀無残斬り Battō Muzan Giri). Though he placed the Gingamen under his spell, only Ryouma is unaffected due to his flame ability. Having until sunset to wake everyone up, Ryouma engages Hyoudogasa, who was duped by Illness's illusion, on horse-back before defeating him in a duel with unexpected help from Bull Black. After drinking Balba-X, Hyoudogasa battles Gingaleon and the Heavy-Knight before being destroyed by Bull Taurus. Voiced by Shigenori Sōya.
 Houretsudou (砲烈道 Hōretsudō, 21) is a crab-like Majin who possesses a staff that allows him to use the Majin Explosion (魔人炸裂弾 Majin Sakuretsudan) attack with the machine gun end and the Majin Intense Burst (魔人強烈砲 Majin Kyōretsuhō) attack with the cannon end. Houretsudou is deployed by Budoh to target tomatoes, believing that one of them held the Galaxy Lights. Though he injured Ginga Green, Houretsudou is disarmed after Hayate overcame his tomato-phobia to fully heal. After being defeated by the Gingamen, Houretsudou drinks Balba-X before being destroyed by Gingaioh. Voiced by Mitsuaki Hoshino.
 Dotoumusha (怒涛武者 Dotōmusha, 22-23) is the most powerful of Budoh's Majin, Dotoumusha is a red lobster-like samurai in indestructible armor whose trademark attack is Jashin Edge Beheading (邪心両斬 Jashin Ryōzan). As this was his master's final chance, Dotoumusha is deployed by Budoh to find a Holy Fountain under the city and siphon the light from it. However, casting the suffocating Wide Cast Force Field to keep the Gingamen and Bull Black from interfering, Dotomusha did not expect Hikaru and Saya's meddling as they find the barrier's weak point and destroy it. Could attack with his "Evil Edge Slash". Despite the setback, Dotomusha succeeded in obtaining the Lights of Ginga in an urn and making has way to Daitanix while fighting off Bull Black. However, Medoumedou, in the guise of Budoh, tricks Dotoumusha into using the Lights of Ginga on himself to test the power on the Gingamen. With his new power, enough to cause a massive forest fire with his "Luminous Ball" and "Great Evil Flame Slash" attacks. Dotomusha overpowers the enraged Gingamen before Medoumedou makes her move, giving him a cursed bracelet that would absorb all of his powers. But Bullblack and cause the Light of Ginga to leave him and enter the Gingamen as they use their new Jusoukou forms to destroy Dotomusha before he can drink his Balba-X. Voiced by Ryūzaburō Ōtomo.

Iliess Majin Tribe 
The Iliess Majin Tribe (イリエス魔人族 Iriesu Majin Zoku) are the phantom beast Majin based on different entities from various mythologies. They enter in action after Iliess sets up Budoh as a tratior, utilizing ways of reviving Daitanix through sorcery involving mass sacrifices. Their Balba-X container was a boot-like vial and their symbol is an Egyptian-looking eye.

 Medoumedou (メドウメドウ Medōmedō, 2, 19, 23-24) is a shape-shifting gorgon-themed Majin armed with a whip who represented Iliess when Zaihab was selecting his leading general. When Iliess learns that Budoh succeeded with Dotoumusha obtaining the Galaxy Lights, Medoumedou assumed Budoh's form to trick the Dotomusha into using the Galaxy Lights while giving him a beaded snake bracelet to siphon the Lights from him once Budoh is charged with treason. When Iliess is made acting general, Medoumedou is set after Budoh, revealing her role in his downfall before he killed her. Voiced by Narumi Tsunoda
 Wangawanga (ワンガワンガ Wangawanga, 25, 34, Gingaman vs. Megaranger) is a tiki/witch doctor-themed Majin whose Spear of Hatred requires hate-filled souls. Finding Bull Black's soul most suitable, Wangawanga is kept at bay by the Gingamen before they use their Juusoukou forms to defeat him. After drinking his Barba-X, Wangawanga is destroyed by Super Armor Shine Gingaioh as his Spear of Hatred fell into Mt. Kongou, with Bull Black sacrificing himself to contain the energy. Wangawanga is one of the five Majin revived by Illiess to keep the Gingaman from reaching a tower, which was supplying power to Daitanix. He holds off Hayate, but disappears after Ryouma destroys Iliess' tower. He is later killed once again by the Megarangers in Seijuu Sentai Gingaman vs. Megaranger. Voiced by Mahito Tsujimura.
 Geltgelt (ゲルトゲルト Gerutogeruto, 26, Gingaman vs. Megaranger) is a gashadokuro-themed knight Majin whose mirror shield to traps people in mirrors with his Grudge Seal spell. He is sent by Iliess to gather 39 mirrors, four holding Hayate, Gouki, hikaru, and Saya, as offerings for a ritual to break the seal on Daidanix. When Ryouma and Hyuuga come to their aid, Geltgelt brought three dolls to life to keep them at bay. Destroying Geltgelt's shield with a double Fire Mane, freeing everyone in the process, the Gingamen defeat Geltgelt as he drinks Barba-X to overpower Super Armor Shine Gingaioh, trapping him in his Mirror Bind. However, when Hyuuga inherits the title of Black Knight, Geltgelt meets his end fighting Bull Taurus. Geltgelt is later revived and killed once again by the Megarangers in Seijuu Sentai Gingaman vs. Megaranger. Voiced by Shun Yashiro.
 Morgumorgu (モルグモルグ Morugumorugu, 27, 34) is a mummy-themed Majin. He intended to revive Daitanix using the extracted beauty of 81 virgins. He can wrap his bandages around women's faces and steal/extract their beauty by turning it into grains of sand. He is killed by Bull Taurus & Super Armor Shine Gingaioh. He is one of the five majins that Iliess revives to keep the Gingaman from approaching her Mystical Tower. He holds off Saya while the rest of the team destroys the tower. He disappears when Ryouma destroys the tower. Voiced by Shōzō Iizuka.
 Hielahiela (ヒエラヒエラ Hierahiera, 28, 34, Gingaman vs. Megaranger) is a fallen angel-themed Majin, who wields a bow and arrow. She could fire explosive arrows and, when majorly attacked, she'd shatter into ice cubes and reform. This ability, however, only worked until the giant iceberg containing the frozen souls of 111 people was destroyed. She can also breathe out a short, but powerful, wintery blast of ice from her mouth. She intended to revive Daitanix using 111 frozen souls. This worked by her shooting an arrow into someone making them act cold and emotionless. After a few hours, she would summon them to a cave and remove the arrow, now a rosy red, and put it into the iceberg. She is killed by Bull Taurus & Super Armor Shine Gingaioh. She is one of the five majins revived by Iliess to keep the Gingaman from reaching the tower and attacks Hikaru, only to disappear when Ryouma destroys the tower. She is later revived by Gregory and killed once again by the Megarangers in Seijuu Sentai Gingaman vs. Megaranger. Voiced by Emi Shinohara.
 Barukibaruki (バルキバルキ Barukibaruki, 30, 34) is a Bigfoot-themed Majin. Barukibaruki is given Biznella's remote control and asked to command the brainwashed Steel Starbeasts. Barukibaruki could fire a green laser from his clawed hand in battle. He is killed by Super Armor Shine Gingaioh after being assaulted from the vengeful Giga Rhinos, Giga Phoenix & Giga Bitus. Barukibaruki is one of the five majin whom Illiess resurrected to keep the Gingaman from reaching her tower. He holds off Gouki, and later disappears when Ryouma destroys the tower. Voiced by Masami Iwasaki.
 Gaaragaara (ガーラガーラ Gāragāra, 31, 34, Gingaman vs. Megaranger) is an asura-themed Majin, able to extend his arms to grab opponents from afar. Posing as a fortune teller, Garagara gathers palm imprints of 333 hands to perform a ritual that will revive Daitanix while turning those he deceived into stone within an hour. Among the inflicted are Hayate and Yuuta, with the others and Hyuga managing to ruin Garagara's ritual. With Ginga Green joining the fray, the Beast Armor Shine Gingamen defeat Garagara. Drinking his Barba-X, Garagara overpowers Gingaioh until the Koseijuu intervene with the Majin destroyed by Gingaioh, GigaRhinos, and GigaPhoenix's trademark attacks. A construct of Garagara is created by Illiess to protect her tower from the Gingaman, holding Hyuuga before Ryouma destroys the tower. During the events of Seijuu Sentai Gingaman vs. Megaranger, Garagara is revived before being killed again by the Megarangers. Voiced by Yoku Shioya.
 Merudameruda (メルダメルダ Merudameruda, 32) is Medoumedou's Lamia-themed sister, a snake witch armed with a whip and the cobra-themed Gorgondia motorcycle. Merudameruda is sent by Illiess to revive Daitanix using the fear of 22 people, trapping them within her necklace. Among her victims is Yuriko, with her older brother Ichirou calling the Majin out to get his sister back. But Merudameruda overpowers him before Ryouma drives her off. However, when the Gingamen corner her, Merudameruda summons Gorgondia to overwhelm the Beast Armor Shine Gingamen. With Ichirou giving them time, the Gingamen create the Galeo Pulsar so Ginga Red can destroy Gorgondia. With her victims freed, Merudameruda drinks her Barba-X to battle Super Armor Shine Gingaioh with her illusionary magic. However, GigaRhinos intervenes and Merudameruda is destroyed by Super Armor Shine Gingaioh. Voiced by Miho Yamada.
 Desphias (デスフィアス Desufiasu, 33, Gingaman vs. Megaranger) is a Pharaoh-themed Majin who is also Iliess' younger brother and strongest servant, armed with a staff. Desphias is sent to revive Daitanix using the sadness of 3,333 people by using his "Mask of Sorrow" on them. With the male members of the Gingamen and Hyuga among the inflicted, Saya embarks to Tokiwa Forest to obtain berries that can momentarily cease the sadness. With the aid of a boy named Kyouhei, Saya obtains the berries. Defeated by the Beast Armor Shine Gingaman and the Black Knight, with his staff destroyed, Desphias drinks his Barba-X and goes on a rampage. Overwhelming Super Armor Shine Gingaioh, before GigaPhoenix intervenes, Desphias is destroyed by Super Armor Shine Gingaioh. Desphias is later revived by Gregory and killed once again by the Megarangers in Seijuu Sentai Gingaman vs. Megaranger. Voiced by Kenji Nomura.

Battobas Majin Corps 
The Battobas Majin Corps (バットバス魔人部隊 Battobasu Majin Butai) are machine/weapon/medieval knight-based Majin, the last series of Majin to appear. The members of Battobas Army seek to fully awaken Daitanix after their leader succeeded in resurrecting it. Their Balba-X container is an ale barrel and their symbol is a stylized anchor, proclaiming a Strategy Change upon drinking it. Whenever a member of the Battobas Majin Corps appears, he has the Yartots introduce themselves while praising their strength.

 Bammers (バマース Bamāsu, 35, Gingaman vs. Megaranger) is a hammer-themed Majin armed with a mallet and a machine gun built in his chest, he is sent to gather a large amount glass needed to build a pacemaker for Daitanix. Though he overpowered Ginga Blue, Ms. Suzuko gives him the strength to overpower Bammers. Defeated by Beast Armor Shine Ginga Blue, Bammers drinks his Baruba-X and overwhelms Super Armor Shine Gingaioh until Giga Rhinos turns the tables so Gingaioh can finish the Majin off. Bammer is later revived during the events of Seijuu Sentai Gingaman vs. Megaranger, destroyed by the Megarangers. Voiced by Hiroyuki Rinzo
 Bombus (ボンブス Bonbusu, 36, Gingaman vs. Megaranger) is a bomb-themed Majin able to turn his right hand into a bazooka. Bombus is sent to heat up a special healing ore for Daitanix's heart by having his Yarots plant thirty specially made bombs across Tokyo so the heat from the intense explosion turning the city into an inferno would be effective. However, an accidental detonation reveals Bombus's actions to the Gingamen with the scheme foiled by Hayate with Haruhiko's help. After being defeated by the Beast Armor Shine Ginga Green, Bombus drinks Balba-X before he is destroyed by Super Armor Shine Gingaioh with assistance from Giga Phoenix. Bombus later among the resurrected Barban Majin destroyed by the Megarangers in Seijuu Sentai Gingaman vs. Megaranger. Voiced by Toshiharu Sakurai.
 Gopies (ゴビース Gobīsu, 37) is a copier-themed knight Majin who can scan and copy his opponent's weapons and attacks into exact duplications. He was sent to kill Gou Taurus as part of a plot to complete Daitanix's revival. But the plan failed when Bucrates overheard him and got to Gou Taurus before him and the Yartots. However, he became confused when the Gingaman performed each other's trademark attacks and/or wielded the other's weapons (Red doing Green's moves, Yellow doing Blue, Green doing Pink, Blue doing Yellow, and Pink doing Red), followed by activating Beast Armor Shine to summon the Galeo Pulsar to finish him off. Gopies is enlarged, but is eventually killed in the confusion by Giga Phoenix using Giga Rhinos' Gigantis Buster and then by Super Armor Shine Gingaioh. Voiced by Kairi Narita.
 Magdus (マグダス Magudasu, 38, Gingaman vs. Megaranger) is a magnet-themed Majin. He wields a large staff with a magnet on the end. He kidnapped children in an attempt to somehow use them to clean Daitanix's veins. He is killed by Super Armor Shine Gingaioh after getting thrashed by Giga Rhinos and again by the Megarangers in Seijuu Sentai Gingaman vs. Megaranger. Voiced by Hajime Koseki.
 Bazoogas (バズガス Bazugasu, 39, Gingaman vs. Megaranger) is a bazooka-themed and bazooka-wielding Majin. He tries to enlarge a massage machine for Daitanix. He also accidentally enlarges Saya, who takes advantage of her size and threatened to crush him if he did not restore her to her proper size, which he does eventually do. He is killed by Giga Phoenix and Super Armor Shine Gingaioh and again by the Megarangers in Seijuu Sentai Gingaman vs. Megaranger. Voiced by Masami Iwasaki.
 Degius (Degiusu, 40) is a wrecking ball-themed warrior. He was once a warrior of good who became corrupted and joined the ranks of the Barban. He is eventually killed being forced to give energy to revive Daitanix. When he dies, Ginga Yellow turns his sword into a monument of sorts to remember him by placing his sword on the beach to look like a cross gravestone sticking out of the sand. Voiced by Kiyoshi Kobayashi.
 Dangs (ダングス Dangusu, 2, 44, Gingaman vs. Megaranger) is a tank-themed Majin. He was the first to attempt giving the Earth Beast the new Extreme Growth Extract. He is killed by Giga Rhinos & Super Armor Shine Gingaioh and later by the Megarangers in Seijuu Sentai Gingaman vs. Megaranger. Voiced by Hiroshi Koike
 Chainzaws (ヂェンゾス Chenzosu, 45, Gingaman vs. Megaranger) is a chainsaw-themed and chainsaw-wielding Majin. He tried to use an industrial chimney to give the Earth Beast the Extreme Growth Extract. He is killed by Giga Phoenix & Super Armor Shine Gingaioh and again by the Megarangers in Seijuu Sentai Gingaman vs. Megaranger. Voiced by Kyōsei Tsukui.
 Zakkas (ザッカス Zakkasu, 46) is a Masakari-themed Majin. He wields a crescent blade in battle. He was summoned to destroy the land of a site in which the Extreme Growth Extract was to be poured. He is killed by Super Armor Shine Gingaioh after being attacked many times by Giga Rhinos. Voiced by Akio Ōtsuka.
 Mizziles (ミザルス Mizarusu, 48) is a missile-themed Majin. He was summoned to shoot a missile containing the Extreme Growth Extract to the Earth Beast. He also had smaller, built-in, missile launchers in his wrists, which he used in battle. Initially he had the advantage as the Gingamen were weakening since the Extreme Growth Extract was poisoning the Earth and affecting their Earth Powers until Wisdom Tree Moak sacrifices himself to remove this. Afterwards they succeed in foiling his plan and then defeat him. He is killed by Gingaioh, with help from Giga Phoenix. Voiced by Masayuki Omoro.

Demon Beasts

Daitanix 
Demon Beast Daitanix (魔獣ダイタニクス Majū Daitanikusu, 1-42) was born in a contaminated star (which also happened to be Zahab's home planet) and his only instinct/purpose is to destroy planets by absorbing their life force to condense into jewels, which Zahab would add to his collection to maintain his immortality and to expand the lives of his followers. In battle, Daitanix possesses powerful jaws, his tail is extremely muscular, and he can fire powerful blasts of energy from his mouth. By attaching his castle to Daitanix's back, Zahab was able to control him, destroying and absorbing stars throughout the Milky Way. The goal of the Barban is the resurrection of Daitanix which was still in a state of lifelessness after the seal was broken in the earthquake. The plan finally succeeds when Iliess' lifeforce is absorbed by him. It results in the monster's heart beating and Battobas eventually gathered enough energy to fully revive him by having Degius act as a conduct for a massive amount of energy from a passing Asteroid. When finally revived, he easily defeated Super Armor Shine Gingaioh even with Giga Rhinos and Giga Phoenix, but his body decays during the fight as his back where the Barban castle stood had gotten too far rotten, so the Barban leave the monster to die. After the Gingamen and Black Knight damage his back in the following battle he is overpowered by Bull Taurus armed with the Knight Axe, double-teaming Giga Phoenix and Giga Rhinos, and then finally killed by Super Armor Shine Gingaioh.

Earth Demon Beast 
The Earth Demon Beast (地球魔獣 Chikyū Majū, 44-50) was the result of a piece of Daitanix's flesh ending up within the Earth itself upon being destroyed, feeding on the life of the planet. The Barban then decides to make him the new host of their castle. However, having just been born, the Earth Demon Beast was still in an immature state, so Battobas attempts to give him the Extreme Growth Extract eventually succeeding with the monster now fully grown but at the cost of his life. At full size, he possessed immense brute strength, could breathe fire, and was able to fire deadly bursts of energy from his claws. During the battle, Ryouma focuses on using his Earth element of fire so they could destroy the Earth Demon Beast without the risk of creating a new Demon Beast. Having attached the castle to him, Zahab confronts Gingaman, increasing the Earth Demon Beast's fighting abilities. The Earth Demon Beast puts up an excellent fight, to which Hyuuga uses up most of Bull Taurus's power to destroy Zahab's castle and fight Zahab elsewhere to give the others a fighting chance. After a hard battle, the beast is killed by a sustained burst of fire from Super Armor Shine Gingaioh after gaining a power boost from Giga Rhinos and Giga Phoenix, which incinerates his body in the process.

Ghelmadix 
Demon Beast Fortress Ghelmadix (魔獣要塞ゲルマディック Majū Yōsai Gerumadikusu, Gingaman vs. Megaranger) is the second red-colored Daitanix that belongs to Gregory. Originally, it was called Daitanix 2. Giga Rhinos and Giga Phoenix use all their power to try to destroy it, which cause themselves to be destroyed in the process. Unfortunately, Daitanix 2 was only injured, and used the Earth's energy to heal itself, becoming a blue-colored version of itself, now named Ghelmadix. It is killed by Bull Taurus & Super Armor Shine Gingaioh.

Episodes

Cast
: 
: Koji (Played as )
: 
: 
, Misaki Hoshino (Episode 14): 
: 
: 
: 
: 
: 
: 
: 
: 
: 
 (voice): 
 (voice): 
 (voice): 
 (voice): 
 (voice): 
 (voice): 
 (voice): 
 (voice): 
 (voice): 
 (voice): 
:

Songs

Opening theme

Lyrics: Shoko Fujibayashi
Composition & Arrangement: Toshihiko Sahashi
Artist:

Ending theme

Lyrics: Shoko Fujibayashi
Composition: 
Arrangement: 
Artist: Ryū Kisami

International Broadcasts and Home Video
In Indonesia, the series aired with an Indonesian dub on Indosiar under the name, Cosmic Ranger. Despite the popularity of Power Rangers in that country, this was the very last Super Sentai series to be released and dubbed in full for the region until Uchu Sentai Kyuranger made its debut in 2019 there with a full dub.
In Thailand, the series was given a Thai dub in 2000 and TIGA Company had the rights to it, despite Power Rangers Lost Galaxy was aired there. They were prioritized to release the series on VHS and VCD after they lost the rights to Mirai Sentai Timeranger during that time as it went to Rose Home Entertainment (formerly Rose Video), so they released this series instead.
The series aired in Hong Kong with a Cantonese Chinese dub from December 16, 2001 until November 24, 2002 on TVB Jade with all 50 episodes dubbed.
In North America, the series would receive a DVD release by Shout! Factory on January 30, 2018 in the original Japanese audio with English subtitles. It is the seventh Super Sentai series to be officially released in the region.

Notes

References

External links
 Official Seijuu Sentai Gingaman website at super-sentai.net 
 Gingaman at the Official Toei Website 
 Official Shout! Factory page
 Official Shout Factory TV page

Super Sentai
1990s Japanese television series
1998 Japanese television series debuts
1999 Japanese television series endings
Japanese action television series
Japanese fantasy television series
Japanese science fiction television series
Television series about alien visitations
Television shows written by Yasuko Kobayashi
TV Asahi original programming